Zingiswa Losi is a South African politician and a member of the African National Congress (ANC) Losi is also the first female president of the Congress of South African Trade Unions (COSATU), she was nominated and elected unopposed to this position along with other leaders, taking over from S'dumo Dlamini, known as a strong supporter of former South African President Jacob Zuma, on 18 September 2018.

Losi was a candidate for the position of deputy secretary general of the ANC at the party's national elective conference in 2017 December which she lost to the incumbent Jessie Duarte. Losi was elected as a member of the ANC's National Executive Committee at the same conference.

References

Year of birth missing (living people)
Living people
African National Congress politicians
South African trade unionists
South African women in politics